The Amadeus Austrian Music Awards is the annual awards ceremony for excellence in the Austrian music industry. It has been awarded to the most successful Austrian musicians since 2000, and has been held in the Volkstheater in Vienna each March since 2012. It is the Austrian equivalent to the Grammys.

History
The awards ceremony was founded by IFPI Austria in 2000, and was broadcast by the Austrian national broadcaster  Österreichischer Rundfunk (ORF). Andi Knoll hosted the show. In 2008, the broadcasters Puls 4 and ProSiebenSat.1 Media began hosting the ceremony together. Michael Ostrowski hosted the show from 2008 until 2010, and Manuel Rubey began hosting in 2012. Since 2012, the ceremony has been held in Volkstheater, after previously being held in Gasometer B, Kunsthalle Wien, and Wiener Stadthalle. The 2011 ceremony was canceled and later rescheduled as the 2012 event.

Awards
Awards can be awarded to any musician with Austrian citizenship or who have established their career in Austria. As of 2016, there are 19 categories.

General

Band of the Year
Male Artist of the Year
Female Artist of the Year
Album of the Year
Song of the Year

Live Act of the Year
Video of the Year 
Songwriter of the Year
FM4 Award
Lifetime Achievement
Best Engineered Album

Genre

Alternative Pop / Rock
Hard & Heavy
HipHop / Urban
Jazz / World / Blues

Electronic / Dance
Pop / Rock
Schlager
Folk music

References

External links

Annual television shows
Awards established in 2000
2000 establishments in Austria
Austrian music awards